Bozbinə is a village in the Zaqatala Rayon of Azerbaijan.  The village forms part of the municipality of Dombabinə.

References

External links

Populated places in Zaqatala District